FR-2 (Flame Resistant 2) is a NEMA designation for synthetic resin bonded paper, a composite material made of paper impregnated with a plasticized phenol formaldehyde resin, used in the manufacture of printed circuit boards. Its main properties are similar to NEMA grade XXXP (MIL-P-3115) material, and can be substituted for the latter in many applications.

Applications 
FR-2 sheet with copper foil lamination on one or both sides is widely used to build low-end consumer electronic equipment. While its electrical and mechanical properties are inferior to those of epoxy-bonded fiberglass, FR-4, it is significantly cheaper. It is not suitable for devices installed in vehicles, as continuous vibration can make cracks propagate, causing hairline fractures in copper circuit traces. Without copper foil lamination, FR-2 is sometimes used for simple structural shapes and electrical insulation.

Properties

Fabrication 
FR-2 can be machined by drilling, sawing, milling and hot punching. Cold punching and shearing are not recommended, as they leave a ragged edge and tend to cause cracking. Tools made of high-speed steel can be used, although tungsten carbide tooling is preferred for high volume production.

Adequate ventilation or respiration protection are mandatory during high-speed machining, as it gives off toxic vapors.

Trade names and synonyms 
 Carta
 Haefelyt
 Lamitex
 Paxolin, Paxoline
 Pertinax, taken over by Lamitec and Dr. Dietrich Müller GmbH in 2014
 Getinax (in the Ex-USSR)
 Phenolic paper
 Preßzell
 Repelit
 Synthetic resin bonded paper (SRBP)
 Turbonit
 Veroboard
 Wahnerit

See also 
 Formica (plastic)
 Micarta

References

Further reading
 

Composite materials
Printed circuit board manufacturing
Synthetic paper